The LaFayette Motors Corporation was a United States-based automobile manufacturer. Founded in 1919, LaFayette Motors was named in honor of the Marquis de la Fayette, and LaFayette autos had a cameo of the Marquis as their logo.

History
LaFayette was originally headquartered in Mars Hill, Indianapolis, Indiana, and made luxury motor cars, beginning in 1920. LaFayette innovations include the first electric clock in an auto. In 1921, Charles W. Nash became president of LaFayette. Nash was already president of Nash Motors, but for a time the two brands remained separate companies, although Nash Motors was the principal LaFayette Motors stock holder. In the 1920s rumors circulated about Pierce-Arrow merging with LaFayette, Rolls-Royce or General Motors.

In 1922, LaFayette's facilities were moved to Milwaukee, Wisconsin.

In 1924, Nash Motors became full owner of LaFayette Motors, and the name was retired soon after. Its factories were quickly put to a new, more profitable use: the manufacture of Ajax motor cars.

In 1934, Nash re-introduced the LaFayette name, this time for a line of smaller, less expensive autos. In 1935, Nash introduced a series known as the "Nash 400" to fill the perceived price gap between the LaFayette and the Nash. By 1937, it was determined that this perceived gap wasn't so important after all, and that Nash Motors was marketing too many models. The LaFayette and the Nash 400 were combined into a single model called the Nash LaFayette 400 for 1937, and the LaFayette ceased to be regarded as a separate make of car. For 1938, this became simply the Nash LaFayette, and the LaFayette line continued as Nash's lowest-priced offering through 1940. For 1941, the LaFayette was replaced by the all-new unibody Nash 600.

See also
List of automobile manufacturers

References

External links

Defunct motor vehicle manufacturers of the United States
Luxury motor vehicle manufacturers
Manufacturing companies based in Indianapolis
Motor vehicle manufacturers based in Indiana
Motor vehicle manufacturers based in Wisconsin
Vehicle manufacturing companies established in 1919
Gilbert du Motier, Marquis de Lafayette
Nash Motors
Defunct manufacturing companies based in Wisconsin
Defunct manufacturing companies based in Indiana
1920s cars
Vintage vehicles
Pre-war vehicles